Nemapogon bachmarensis is a moth of the family Tineidae. It is found in the Caucasus.

References

Moths described in 1964
Nemapogoninae